Evergestis infirmalis is a species of moth in the family Crambidae. It is found in Greece, European Russia, Turkey and Syria.

The wingspan is 22–26 mm. Females are somewhat larger than males. In Greece, adults are on wing in July.

References

Moths described in 1871
Evergestis
Moths of Asia
Moths of Europe